Delet Haksamim (lit. "The magic door") is an Israeli educational children's television program which deals with road traffic safety intended for its main target audience, primary school students. It was produced by the Israeli Film Service and co-product Israel's Ministry of Education and Ministry of Transport and Road Safety and written Avraham Heffner and Yitzhak Ben Ner. The program was aired in 1974 on the Israeli Educational Television (IETV), since aired in reruns at the 1980s.

Background
The program follows after a magician called Yehoyakim Kook (Gideon Singer), who taught two siblings, Yoav and Hagar Bergman about road safety through a door to beep each time when someone has non-observance of the road safety laws. Then he is summons and shows them through a magical eye how they misdeeds to be finished with disaster. Usually each episode the siblings getting on the nervous of old pharmacist Dr. Tuvia Guttman (Mordechai Ben-Ze'ev) and then sent his assistant, Hertzel (Gidi Gov) out of his store to chase them due to different problems.

External links 
 

Israeli children's television series
Black-and-white television shows
Israeli Educational Television
1974 Israeli television series debuts
1970s Israeli television series